In political philosophy and ethics, political authority  describes any of the moral principles legitimizing differences between individuals' rights and duties by virtue of their relationship with the state. Political authority grants members of a government the right to rule over citizens using coercion if necessary (i.e., political legitimacy), while imposing an obligation for the citizens to obey government orders (i.e., political obligation).

A central question in political philosophy is "To what extent is political authority legitimate?" Views range from political authority and having no legitimacy (philosophical anarchism) to political authority being virtually unlimited in scope (totalitarianism).

References 

Political philosophy